Andrés Eduardo Olivas (born 27 May 1998) is a Mexican racewalking athlete. He qualified to represent Mexico at the 2020 Summer Olympics in Tokyo 2021, competing in men's 20 kilometres walk.

References

External links
 

 

1998 births
Living people
Mexican male racewalkers
Athletes (track and field) at the 2020 Summer Olympics
Olympic athletes of Mexico
Pan American Games competitors for Mexico
Athletes (track and field) at the 2019 Pan American Games
Sportspeople from Chihuahua (state)
People from Chihuahua City
21st-century Mexican people